Pulicaria dioscorides is a species of flowering plant in the family Asteraceae. It is found only in Yemen. Its natural habitat is rocky areas.

References

Further reading
 Miller, A. G. & Morris, M. (2004). "Ethnoflora of the Soqotra Archipelago". Royal Botanic Garden, Edinburgh.  [species original description]

dioscorides
Endemic flora of Socotra
Endangered plants
Taxonomy articles created by Polbot